Theodore A. Wright (September 20, 1901 – February 15, 1974) was an American football, basketball, and track coach and college athletics administrator. He served as the head football coach at Florida A&M University (1933) and Savannah State University (1947–1949). Wright was also the head basketball coach at Xavier University of Louisiana (1934–1938, 1946–1947) and at Savannah State (1948–1962).

Wright graduated in 1925 from Baker University in Baldwin City, Kansas, where he lettered in football, basketball, and tennis.  He earned all-Kansas honors in football as a halfback.  In 1926–27, Wright coached at Western University in Kansas City, Missouri.  The following year, he was the director of physical education at Lincoln High School in Kansas City, leading both his football and basketball teams to championships.  In 1928, Wright became an assistant football coach at Talladega College in Talladega, Alabama.  He was promoted to head football coach the following year.

References

External links
 

1901 births
1974 deaths
Baker Wildcats football players
Baker Wildcats men's basketball players
Basketball coaches from Kansas
Basketball players from Kansas
Florida A&M Rattlers football coaches
Savannah State Tigers and Lady Tigers athletic directors
Savannah State Tigers football coaches
Savannah State Tigers basketball coaches
Talladega Tornadoes football coaches
Xavier Gold Rush and Gold Nuggets athletic directors
Xavier Gold Rush football coaches
Xavier Gold Rush basketball coaches
College men's tennis players in the United States
College track and field coaches in the United States
High school football coaches in Missouri
High school basketball coaches in Missouri
People from Baldwin City, Kansas
African-American coaches of American football
African-American players of American football
African-American basketball coaches
African-American basketball players
African-American college athletic directors in the United States
African-American male tennis players
20th-century African-American sportspeople